Lee Seung-su (Hangul: 이승수; born 20 July 1990) is a South Korean judoka.

Career
Lee is the South Korea national team's primary half-middleweight fighter, having represented them at the 2014 and 2015 World Judo Championships. He was also chosen as the half-middleweight representative in the 2015 World team competition, where he won a silver medal.

His main skill is seoi nage, a trademark of the Korea national team.

On the International Judo Federation circuit, he has won a silver medal at the 2015 Grand Slam in Tokyo and the 2013 Grand Prix in Jeju and Rijeka.

A soldier of the Republic of Korea Armed Forces, Lee has participated in various military games, and most notably won the gold medal at the 2015 Military World Games in Mungyeong.

Lee became Korea's half-middleweight representative after defeating double world champion Wang Ki-chun as the latter ascended from lightweight. He has consistently won the national title in the weight division, however lost to Wang in the 2015 Korea National Championships.

Lee is ranked No. 29 in the world rankings, and is the second ranked in Korea for the Olympic qualifiers after Wang.

Competitive record

References

External links
 
 

South Korean male judoka
1990 births
Living people
Judoka at the 2016 Summer Olympics
Olympic judoka of South Korea
Universiade medalists in judo
Judoka at the 2018 Asian Games
Universiade gold medalists for South Korea
Asian Games competitors for South Korea
Medalists at the 2013 Summer Universiade
21st-century South Korean people